John Henry Jones (26 October 1894 – 31 October 1962) was a British Labour Party politician.

Jones was born in Rotherham, and educated at Port Talbot School, at an elementary school in Rotherham, and at Bangor University. He worked as a steel smelter, and during World War I he served in the Middle East with the East Riding of Yorkshire Yeomanry.

He was elected at the 1945 general election as a member of parliament (MP) for Bolton, and held the seat until the constituency abolished in 1950. He was then elected as MP for Rotherham at the 1950 general election, and held the seat until he was killed in a road accident on Halloween 1962.

Jones was Parliamentary Private Secretary to Lord Pakenham while he was Chancellor of the Duchy of Lancaster, and to the Under-Secretary for Foreign Affairs Christopher Mayhew from May to October 1947. He was a joint Parliamentary Secretary to the Ministry of Supply from October 1947 to 1950.

References

External links 
 

1894 births
1962 deaths
Iron and Steel Trades Confederation-sponsored MPs
Labour Party (UK) MPs for English constituencies
UK MPs 1950–1951
UK MPs 1951–1955
UK MPs 1955–1959
UK MPs 1959–1964
Road incident deaths in England
British Army personnel of World War I
Ministers in the Attlee governments, 1945–1951